Chief Petty Officer Rakesh Kumar Patra (born 25 February 1992) is an Indian male artistic gymnast, representing his nation at international competitions. He competed at world championships, including the 2013 World Artistic Gymnastics Championships in Antwerp, Belgium. He is supported by the GoSports Foundation through the Rahul Dravid mentorship programme. He is a Junior Commissioned Officer in Indian Navy.

Early life and background 
Rakesh got into Gymnastics in the year 2003 after being inspired by his uncle Suvendu Patra, a former international gymnast in 2001. Rakesh has been working in the Indian Navy since 2010. His parents are unwell and Rakesh also has a sister whom he takes care of.

Career 
Ranked 25th, he narrowly missed the Olympic qualification for Rio, 2016, as only the top 24 in the world qualify for the Olympics. Any country’s withdrawal would have given him an entry into the games, but that did not happen. At the Asian Championships, Patra qualified for the final in the Men’s Rings apparatus and finished eighth in the final.
He strives for perfection and is adamant on winning a medal at Tokyo 2020. Recently, he spent 20 days on a high-performance stint in China and got the opportunity to work on his basics to improve at his sport. Rakesh looks up to five-time world champion and two-time Olympic champion, Kohei Uchimura for inspiration.

Achievements 
 2018: Qualified for the ring apparatus finals at the CWG, Gold coast
 2017: Finished 8th at the Asian Championships
 2015: Represented India – World Championship

References 

1992 births
Living people
Indian male artistic gymnasts
Gymnasts at the 2010 Commonwealth Games
Gymnasts at the 2014 Commonwealth Games
Gymnasts at the 2018 Commonwealth Games
Gymnasts at the 2010 Asian Games
Gymnasts at the 2014 Asian Games
Gymnasts at the 2018 Asian Games
Sportspeople from Odisha
Asian Games competitors for India
Indian Navy personnel
Commonwealth Games competitors for India